Debbie Reynolds (1932–2016) was an American actress, singer and dancer.

Debbie, Debby, or Deborah Reynolds may also refer to:
 Debby Reynolds (born 1952), English veterinarian
 Deborah Reynolds (born 1953), American politician
 The Debbie Reynolds Show (1969–1970), a U.S. sitcom

See also
 Debbie Reynolds' Hollywood Hotel and Casino, former name of the Clarion Hotel and Casino in Las Vegas